The 2017 Spa-Francorchamps FIA Formula 2 round was a pair of motor races held on 26 and 27 August 2017 at the Circuit de Spa-Francorchamps in Stavelot, Belgium as part of the FIA Formula 2 Championship. It was the eighth round of the 2017 FIA Formula 2 Championship and was run in support of the 2017 Belgian Grand Prix.

Background 
Charles Leclerc, once again, entered the round as the championship leader with a significant margin over nearest rival, Oliver Rowland. Rowland had closed the gap in the previous round in Hungary, but nevertheless was still 54 points behind the Monégasque driver.

For this round, Rapax had inherited an entirely new driver lineup with Sergio Canamasas and Nyck de Vries making way for Louis Delétraz and Roberto Merhi. Nyck de Vries and Louis Delétraz effectively switched seats with de Vries going from Rapax to Racing Engineering and Delétraz vice versa.

Classifications

Qualifying

Feature Race

Sprint Race

Championship standings after the round

Drivers' Championship standings

Teams' Championship standings

 Note: Only the top five positions are included for both sets of standings.

References

External links 
 

Spa-Francorchamps
Formula 2
Formula 2